The Asian Basketball Club Championship 1990 was the 4th staging of the Asian Basketball Club Championship, the basketball club tournament of Asian Basketball Confederation. The tournament was held in Jakarta, Indonesia from June 19 to June 25, 1990.

Final standing

References
Fibaasia.net

1990
1990 in Asian basketball
1990 in Indonesian sport
International basketball competitions hosted by Indonesia